The Justice and Development Party  (AKP), abbreviated officially AK Party in English, is a political party in Turkey self-describing as conservative-democrat. It is one of the two major parties of contemporary Turkey along with the Republican People's Party (CHP).

Recep Tayyip Erdoğan has been chairman of AKP since the 2017 Party Congress. The AKP is the largest party in the Grand National Assembly, the Turkish national legislature, with 285 out of 600 seats, having won 42.6% of votes in the 2018 Turkish parliamentary election. It forms the People's Alliance with the Nationalist Movement Party (MHP). The current AKP parliamentary leader is İsmet Yılmaz.

Founded in 2001 by members of a number of parties such as FP, ANAP and DYP, the party has a strong base of support among people from the conservative tradition of Turkey, though the party strongly denies it is Islamist. The party positioned itself as pro-liberal market economy, supporting Turkish membership in the European Union. Orange is the party's main colour. Other colours include white for the logo, blue for the flag, and orange-white-blue-red for the corporate design.

The AKP is the only party in Turkey with a significant presence in all provinces of Turkey. Since the beginning of Turkey's multiparty democracy in 1946, AKP is the only party to win six consecutive parliamentary elections. The AKP has headed the national government since 2002 under Abdullah Gül (2002–2003), Recep Tayyip Erdoğan (2003–2014), Ahmet Davutoğlu (2014–2016), Binali Yıldırım (2016–2018) and Recep Tayyip Erdoğan (2018–present). AKP's rule has been marked with increasing authoritarianism, expansionism, censorship and banning of parties or dissent.

The party was an observer in the European People's Party between 2005 and 2013. After disappointment of not being granted full membership in the EPP, the party became member of the Alliance of Conservatives and Reformists in Europe (ACRE) from 2013 to 2018.

History

Formation 
The AKP was established by a wide range of politicians of various political parties and a number of new politicians in 2001. The core of the party was formed from the reformist faction of the Islamist Virtue Party, including people such as Abdullah Gül and Bülent Arınç, while a second founding group consisted of members of the social conservative Motherland Party who had been close to Turgut Özal, such as Cemil Çiçek and Abdülkadir Aksu. Some members of the True Path Party, such as Hüseyin Çelik and Köksal Toptan, joined the AKP. Some members, such as Kürşad Tüzmen had nationalist or Ertuğrul Günay, had center-left backgrounds while representatives of the nascent 'Muslim left' current were largely excluded. In addition. a large number of people joined a political party for the first time, such as Ali Babacan, Nimet Baş, Egemen Bağış and Mevlüt Çavuşoğlu.

Closure cases 

Controversies over whether the party remains committed to secular principles enshrined in the Turkish constitution have dominated Turkish politics since 2002. Turkey's constitution established the country as a secular state and prohibits any political parties that promote Islamism or shariah law.

Since coming to power, the party has brought about tighter regulations on abortion and higher taxes on alcohol consumption, leading to allegations that it is covertly undermining Turkish secularism.  Some activists, commentators, opponents and government officials have accused the party of Islamism. The Justice and Development Party has faced two "closure cases" (attempts to officially ban the party, usually for Islamist practices) in 2002 and 2008.

Just 10 days before the national elections of 2002, Turkey's chief prosecutor, Sabih Kanadoğlu, asked the Turkish constitutional court to close the Justice and Development Party, which was leading in the polls at that time. The chief prosecutor charged the Justice and Development Party with abusing the law and justice. He based his case on the fact that the party's leader had been banned from political life for reading an Islamist poem, and thus the party had no standing in elections. The European Commission had previously criticized Turkey for banning the party's leader from participating in elections.

The party again faced a closure trial in 2008 brought about by the lifting of a long-standing university ban on headscarves. At an international press conference in Spain, Erdoğan answered a question of a journalist by saying, "What if the headscarf is a symbol? Even if it were a political symbol, does that give [one the] right to ban it? Could you bring prohibitions to symbols?" These statements led to a joint proposal of the Justice and Development Party and the far-right Nationalist Movement Party for changing the constitution and the law to lift a ban on women wearing headscarves at state universities. Soon afterwards, Turkey's chief prosecutor, Abdurrahman Yalçınkaya, asked the Constitutional Court of Turkey to close down the party on charges of violating the separation of religion and state in Turkey. The closure request failed by only one vote, as only 6 of the 11 judges ruled in favor, with 7 required; however, 10 out of 11 judges agreed that the Justice and Development Party had become "a center for anti-secular activities", leading to a loss of 50% of the state funding for the party.

Merger with People's Voice Party 
In September 2012, two-year-old conservative-oriented People's Voice Party (HAS Parti) dissolved itself and joined the ruling Justice and Development Party (AKP) with a majority of its delegates' votes. In July 2012, following long-held speculation that former HSP leader Numan Kurtulmuş was on Prime Minister Erdoğan's mind as his possible successor as party head, Erdoğan personally proposed to Kurtulmuş the idea of merging the parties under the umbrella of the AKP.

Elections 
The party has won pluralities in the six most recent legislative elections, those of 2002, 2007, 2011, June 2015, November 2015, and 2018.  The party held a majority of seats for 13 years, but lost it in June 2015, only to regain it in the snap election of November 2015 but then lose it again in 2018. Its past electoral success has been mirrored in the three local elections held since the party's establishment, coming first in 2004, 2009 and 2014 respectively. However, the party lost most of Turkey's biggest cities including Istanbul and Ankara in 2019 local elections, which has been attributed to the Turkish economic crisis, accusations of authoritarianism, as well as alleged government inaction on the Syrian refugee crisis.

2002 general elections 
The AKP won a sweeping victory in the 2002 elections, which saw every party previously represented in the Grand National Assembly ejected from the chamber. In the process, it won a two-thirds majority of seats, becoming the first Turkish party in 11 years to win an outright majority. Erdoğan, as the leader of the biggest party in parliament, would have been normally given the task to form a cabinet. However, according to the Turkish Constitution Article 109 the Prime Ministers had to be also a representative of the Turkish Parliament. Erdoğan, who was banned from holding any political office after a 1994 incident in which he read a poem deemed pro-Islamist by judges, was therefore not. As a result, Gül became prime minister. It survived the crisis over the 2003 invasion of Iraq despite a massive back bench rebellion where over a hundred AKP MPs joined those of the opposition Republican People's Party (CHP) in parliament to prevent the government from allowing the United States to launch a Northern offensive in Iraq from Turkish territory. Later, Erdoğan's ban was lifted with the help of the CHP and Erdoğan became prime minister by being elected to the parliament after a by-election in Siirt.

The AKP has undertaken structural reforms, and during its rule Turkey has seen rapid growth and an end to its three decade long period of high inflation rates. Inflation had fallen to 8.8% by 2004.

Influential business publications such as The Economist consider the AKP's government the most successful in Turkey in decades.

2004 local elections 
In the local elections of 2004, the AKP won 42% of the votes, making inroads against the secular Republican People's Party (CHP) on the South and West Coasts, and against the Social Democratic People's Party, which is supported by some Kurds in the South-East of Turkey.

In January 2005, the AKP was admitted as an observer member in the European People's Party (EPP). However, it left the EPP to join the Alliance of European Conservatives and Reformists (AECR) in 2013.

2007 elections 

On 14 April 2007, an estimated 300,000 people marched in Ankara to protest the possible candidacy of Erdoğan in the 2007 presidential election, afraid that if elected as president, he would alter the secular nature of the Turkish state. Erdoğan announced on 24 April 2007 that the party had decided to nominate Abdullah Gül as the AKP candidate in the presidential election. The protests continued over the next several weeks, with over one million reported at an 29 April rally in Istanbul, tens of thousands reported at separate protests on 4 May in Manisa and Çanakkale, and one million in İzmir on 13 May.

Early parliamentary elections were called after the failure of the parties in parliament to agree on the next Turkish president. The opposition parties boycotted the parliamentary vote and deadlocked the election process. At the same time, Erdoğan claimed the failure to elect a president was a failure of the Turkish political system and proposed to modify the constitution.

The AKP achieved a significant victory in the rescheduled 22 July 2007 elections with 46.6% of the vote, translating into control of 341 of the 550 available parliamentary seats. Although the AKP received significantly more votes in 2007 than in 2002, the number of parliamentary seats they controlled decreased due to the rules of the Turkish electoral system. However, they retained a comfortable ruling majority.

Nationally, the elections of 2007 saw a major advance for the AKP, with the party outpolling the pro-Kurdish Democratic Society Party in traditional Kurdish strongholds such as Van and Mardin, as well as outpolling the secular-left CHP in traditionally secular areas such as Antalya and Artvin. Overall, the AKP secured a plurality of votes in 68 of Turkey's 81 provinces, with its strongest vote of 71% coming from Bingöl. Its weakest vote, a mere 12%, came from Tunceli, the only Turkish province where the Alevi form a majority. Abdullah Gül was elected as the President in late August with 339 votes in the third round – the first at which a simple majority is required – after deadlock in the first two rounds, in which a two-thirds majority was needed.

2007 constitutional referendum 

After the opposition parties deadlocked the 2007 presidential election by boycotting the parliament, the ruling AKP proposed a constitutional reform package. The reform package was first vetoed by President Sezer. Then he applied to the Turkish constitutional court about the reform package, because the president is unable to veto amendments for the second time. The court did not find any problems in the package and 69% of the voters supported the constitutional changes.

The reforms consisted of:
 electing the president by popular vote instead of by parliament;
 reducing the presidential term from seven years to five;
 allowing the president to stand for re-election for a second term;
 holding general elections every four years instead of five;
 reducing the quorum of lawmakers needed for parliamentary decisions from 367 to 184.

2009 local elections 
The Turkish local elections of 2009 took place during the financial crisis of 2007–2010. After the success of the AKP in the 2007 general elections, the party saw a decline in the local elections of 2009. In these elections the AKP received 39% of the vote, 3% less than in the local elections of 2004. Still, the AKP remained the dominating party in Turkey. The second party CHP received 23% of the vote and the third party MHP received 16% of the vote. The AKP won in Turkey's largest cities: Ankara and Istanbul.

2010 constitutional referendum 
Reforming the Constitution was one of the main pledges of the AKP during the 2007 election campaign. The main opposition party CHP was not interested in altering the Constitution on a big scale, making it impossible to form a Constitutional Commission (Anayasa Uzlaşma Komisyonu). The amendments lacked the two-thirds majority needed to instantly become law, but secured 336 votes in the 550 seat parliament – enough to put the proposals to a referendum. The reform package included a number of issues: such as the right of individuals to appeal to the highest court, the creation of the ombudsman's office, the possibility to negotiate a nationwide labour contract, positive exceptions for female citizens, the ability of civilian courts to convict members of the military, the right of civil servants to go on strike, a privacy law, and the structure of the Constitutional Court. The referendum was agreed by a majority of 58%.

2014 elections 
In the presidential election of 2014, the AKP's long time leader Recep Tayyip Erdoğan was elected president. In the party's first extraordinary congress, former foreign minister Ahmet Davutoğlu was unanimously elected unopposed as party leader and took over as Prime Minister on 28 August 2014.  Davutoğlu stepped down as Prime Minister on 4 May 2016 following policy disagreements with President Erdoğan.  Presidential aide Cemil Ertem said to Turkish TV that the country and its economy would stabilize further "when a prime minister more closely aligned with President Erdoğan takes office".

2015 general election 
In the general election held on 7 June, the AKP gained 40.87% of the vote and 258 seats in the Grand National Assembly of Turkey (Turkish: Türkiye Büyük Millet Meclisi, TBMM). Though it still remains the biggest party in Turkey, the AKP lost its status as the majority party and the power to form a single-party government. Until then it had held this majority without interruption for 13 years since it had come to power in 2002. Also, in this election, the AKP was pushing to gain 330 seats in the Grand National Assembly so that it could put a series of constitutional changes to a referendum, one of them was to switch Turkey from the current parliamentary government to an American-style executive presidency government. This pursuit met with a series of oppositions and criticism from the opposition parties and their supporters, fearing the measure would give more unchecked power to the current President of Turkey Recep Tayyip Erdoğan, who has drawn fierce criticisms both from home and abroad for his active role in the election, abandoning the traditional presidential role of maintaining a more neutral and impartial position in elections by his predecessors in the office. The result of the Kurdish issues-centered Peoples' Democratic Party, HDP, breaking through the 10% threshold to achieve 13.12% out of the total votes cast and gaining 80 seats in the Grand National Assembly in the election, which caused the AKP to lose its parliamentary majority.

2019 local elections 
In the 2019 local elections, the ruling party AKP lost control of Istanbul and Ankara for the first time in 15 years, as well as 5 of Turkey's 6 largest cities. The loss has been widely attributed to AKP's mismanagement of the Turkish economic crisis, rising authoritarianism as well as alleged government inaction on the Syrian refugee crisis. Soon after the elections, the Turkish government ordered a re-election in Istanbul. The decision led to a downfall on AKP's popularity and it lost the elections again in June with an even greater margin. The result was seen as a huge blow to Erdoğan, who had once said that if his party 'lost Istanbul, we would lose Turkey.' The opposition's landslide was characterized as the 'beginning of the end' for Erdoğan, with international commentators calling the re-run a huge government miscalculation that can lead to a potential İmamoğlu candidacy in the next scheduled presidential election. It is suspected that the scale of the government's defeat could provoke a cabinet reshuffle and early general elections, currently scheduled for June 2023.

Ideology and policies 
Although the party is described as an Islamist party in some media, party officials reject those claims. According to former minister Hüseyin Çelik, "In the Western press, when the AKP administration – the ruling party of the Turkish Republic – is being named, most of the time 'Islamic,' 'Islamist,' 'mildly Islamist,' 'Islamic-oriented,' 'Islamic-based' or 'with an Islamic agenda,' and similar language is being used. These characterizations do not reflect the truth, and they sadden us." Çelik added, "The AKP is a conservative democratic party. The AKP's conservatism is limited to moral and social issues." Also in a separate speech made in 2005, Prime Minister Recep Tayyip Erdoğan stated, "We are not an Islamic party, and we also refuse labels such as Muslim-democrat." Erdoğan went on to say that the AKP's agenda is limited to "conservative democracy".

On the other hand, according to at least one observer (Mustafa Akyol), under the AKP government of Recep Tayyip Erdoğan, starting in 2007, "hundreds of secularist officers and their civilian allies" were jailed, and by 2012 the "old secularist guard" in positions of authority was replaced by members/supporters of the AKP and the Islamic Gülen movement.  On 25 April 2016, the Turkish Parliament Speaker İsmail Kahraman  told a conference of Islamic scholars and writers in Istanbul that "secularism would not have a place in a new constitution”, as Turkey is “a Muslim country and so we should have a religious constitution".  (One of the duties of Parliament Speaker is to pen a new draft constitution for Turkey.)

In recent years, the ideology of the party has shifted more towards Turkish nationalism, causing liberals such as Ali Babacan and some conservatives such as Ahmet Davutoğlu and Abdullah Gül to leave the party. Several writers have also labelled the party as being right-wing populist since 2007.

The party's foreign policy has also been widely described as Neo-Ottomanist, an ideology that promotes renewed Turkish political engagement in the former territories of its predecessor state, the Ottoman Empire. However, the party's leadership has also rejected this label. The party's relationship with the Muslim Brotherhood has drawn allegations of Islamism.

The AKP favors a strong centralized leadership, having long advocated for a presidential system of government and significantly reduced the number of elected local government positions in 2013.

The party was an observer in the centre-right European People's Party between 2005 and 2013 and a member of the Eurosceptic Alliance of Conservatives and Reformists in Europe (ACRE) from 2013 to 2018.

European affiliation 

In 2005, the party was granted observer membership in the European People's Party (EPP).

In November 2013, the party left the EPP to join the Alliance of European Conservatives and Reformists (now European Conservatives and Reformists Party) instead. This move was attributed to the AKP's disappointment to not to be granted full membership in the EPP, while it was admitted as a full member of the AECR. It drew criticism in both national and European discourses, as the driving force of Turkey's aspirations to become a member of the European Union decided to join a largely eurosceptic alliance, abandoning the more influential pro-European EPP, feeding suspicions that AKP wants to join a watered down, not a closely integrated EU. The AKP withdrew from AECR in 2018.

Legislation and positions
From 2002 to 2011 the party passed series of reforms to increase accessibility to healthcare and housing, distribute food subsidies, increased funding for students, improved infrastructure in poorer districts, and improved rights for religious and ethnic minorities. AKP is also widely accredited for overcoming the 2001 economic crisis in Turkey by following International Monetary Fund guidelines, as well as successfully weathering the 2008 financial crisis. From 2002 to 2011 the Turkish economy grew on average by 7.5 percent annually, thanks to lower inflation and interest rates. The government under AKP also backed extensive privatization programs. The average income in Turkey rose from $2,800 U.S. in 2001 to around $10,000 U.S. in 2011, higher than income in some of the new EU member states. Other reforms included increasing civilian representation over military in areas of national security, education and media, and grant broadcasting and increased cultural rights to Kurds. On Cyprus, AKP supported unification of Cyprus, something deeply opposed by the Turkish military. Other AKP reforms included lifting bans on religious and conservative dress, such as headscarves, in universities and public institutions. AKP also ended discrimination against students from religious high schools, who previously had to meet additional criteria in areas of education and upon entry to universities. AKP is also accredited for bringing the Turkish military under civilian rule, a paradigm shift for a country that had experienced constant military meddling for almost a century.

More recently, nationwide protests broke out against the alleged authoritarianism of the AKP in 2013, with the party's perceived heavy-handed response receiving western condemnation and stalling the party's once championed EU accession negotiations. In addition to its alleged attempts to promote Islamism, the party is accused by some of restricting some civil liberties and internet use in Turkey, having temporarily blocked access to Twitter and YouTube in March 2014. Especially after the government corruption scandal involving several AKP ministers in 2013, the party has been increasingly accused of crony capitalism. The AKP favors a strong centralized leadership, having long advocated for a presidential system of government and significantly reduced the number of elected local government positions in 2013.

Criticism 
Critics have accused the AKP of having a 'hidden agenda' despite their public endorsement of secularism and the party maintains informal relations and support for the Muslim Brotherhood. Both the party's domestic and foreign policy has been perceived to be Pan-Islamist or Neo-Ottoman, advocating a revival of Ottoman culture often at the expense of secular republican principles, while increasing regional presence in former Ottoman territories.

The AKP has been criticized for supporting a wide-scale purge of thousands of academics after the failed coup attempt in 2016. Primary, lower secondary and secondary school students were forced to spend the first day of school after the failed coup d'état watching videos about the ‘triumph of democracy’ over the plotters, and listening to speeches equating the civilian counter-coup that aborted the takeover with historic Ottoman victories going back 1000 years. Campaigns have been organised to release higher education personnel and to drop charges against them for peaceful exercise of academic freedom.

Imprisonment of political activists continues, while the chair of Amnesty Turkey has been jailed for standing up to the AKP on trumped up "terrorism charges". These charges have drawn condemnation from many western countries, including from the US State Department, the EU, as well as from international and domestic human rights organisations.

The party has also been criticized by Turkish and international LGBT rights groups including KAOS GL for homophobic statements made by some AKP politicians and for what they argue has become a repressive climate for LGBT rights in Turkey under the AKP. In 2002, Erdoğan said that "homosexuals must be legally protected within the framework of their rights and freedoms." However, commentators have argued the AKP has taken an increasingly hardline stance on LGBT issues since coming to power, which has been characterized variously as part of a general trend towards authoritarianism under the AKP or as motivated by Islamic and militant nationalist sentiments within the party. In 2017, Erdoğan stated that the principle of LGBT rights was "against the values of our nation" and in 2020 endorsed controversial anti-gay statements made by Muslim scholar Ali Erbaş which had received condemnation from some Turkish lawyers and human rights groups. In 2021, AKP deputy chairman and Interior Minister Suleyman Soylu declared LGBT people to be "perverts." Turkish constitutional law experts Sule Ozsoy Boyunsuz and Serkan Koybasi have described public statements on LGBT people made by AKP politicians as hate speech and contradicting the principle of Turkey's policy of secularism. Political scientist Mine Eder has argued that Turkey has experienced a backslide on acceptance and government anti-discrimination support for homosexuals under Erdoğan.

Party leaders

Election results

Presidential elections

General elections

Local elections

Referendums

Footnotes 

  "AK PARTİ" (in all capital letters) is the self-declared abbreviation of the name of the party, as stated in Article 3 of the party charter, while "AKP" is mostly preferred by its opponents; the supporters prefer "AK PARTİ" since the word "ak" in Turkish means "white", "clean", or "unblemished," lending a positive impression. The Chief Public Prosecutor of the Supreme Court of Appeals initially used "AKP", but after an objection from the party, "AKP" was replaced with "Adalet ve Kalkınma Partisi" (without abbreviation) in documents.

Further reading

Literature

Media

See also 

Grand National Assembly of Turkey
List of political parties in Turkey
Politics of Turkey
Parliamentary terms of Turkey

References

External links 

 
AK Youth 

 
Political parties in Turkey
Eurosceptic parties in Turkey